NGC 7029 is an elliptical galaxy located about 120 million light-years away from Earth in the constellation Indus. NGC 7029 has an estimated diameter of 129,000 light-years. It was discovered by astronomer John Herschel on October 10, 1834. It is in a pair of galaxies with NGC 7022.

Group Membership
NGC 7029 is part of the Indus Triplet of galaxies which contains the galaxies NGC 7041 and NGC 7049.

See also 
 List of NGC objects (7001–7840)
 NGC 7002

References

External links 

Elliptical galaxies
Indus (constellation)
7029
66318
Astronomical objects discovered in 1834